Clovelly Dykes is an Iron Age hill fort or earthwork near Clovelly, Devon, England. Situated on the high plateau behind the coast at approx 210 metres above sea level, it is one of the largest and most impressive Early Iron Age hill-forts in Devon.

References

External links
North Devon Archaeological Society - Clovelly Dykes
Clovelly Dykes, Lundy, Isle of Avalon

Hill forts in Devon